Le Cirque was a French restaurant that has had several locations throughout the New York City borough of Manhattan for more than forty years. It is currently closed, with its future status unknown.

New York City history
Le Cirque was established in 1974 by Italian Sirio Maccioni and continued to be run by the family through its closure in 2018. It opened at the Mayfair Regent Hotel at 58 East 65th Street in March 1974. From 1986 to 1992, Daniel Boulud was executive chef and in 1995, it was awarded the James Beard Foundation Award for Outstanding Restaurant. Boulud was succeeded in 1992 by Sylvain Portay, and later Sottha Kuhn, Pierre Schaedelin, Christophe Bellanca (2007–2008) Craig Hopson (beginning in 2008), and Olivier Reginensi. In 1993, the tasting menu cost $90. The restaurant at the Mayfair closed in 1996 and reopened as Le Cirque 2000 at the Palace Hotel in 1997 where it remained a hotspot through 2002.

In 2006, the restaurant moved to a location in the Bloomberg Tower building at One Beacon Court (151 East 58th Street) and operated as Le Cirque New York at One Beacon Court. It comprised  and was designed by interior designer Adam Tihany and architect Costas Kondylis. The family's efforts to transition the restaurant were featured in the documentary film Le Cirque: A Table In Heaven directed by Andrew Rossi.

Le Cirque New York closed on January 1, 2018, due to rising rent costs and other operational challenges, but operated private events on a boat in 2019. Its future plans are unknown as of 2021 due to the COVID-19 pandemic's impact on the restaurant industry and the 2020 death of founder Sirio Maccioni.

Other locations
As of 2019, there were Le Cirque in Las Vegas and three Indian locations: New Delhi, Mumbai, and Bangalore. The Las Vegas location at the Bellagio Hotel served as a second flagship location and had one Michelin Star and an AAA Five-Diamond rating. Their lower-end sister brand Circo has a location in Abu Dhabi, but the Dallas location closed.

References

External links
 Le Cirque Official Website
 

French-American culture in New York City
French restaurants in New York City
Defunct French restaurants in the United States
Restaurants in Manhattan
Defunct restaurants in New York City
Restaurants established in 1974
Restaurants disestablished in 2018
James Beard Foundation Award winners
1974 establishments in New York City
Fine dining